Bidens mitis, the smallfruit beggarticks, is a North American species of flowering plant in the family Asteraceae. It is native to the eastern, southeastern, and south-central parts of the United States, from eastern Texas to southern New Jersey.

Bidens mitis is an annual or sometimes perennial herb up to 100 cm (40 inches) tall. It produces numerous yellow flower heads containing both disc florets and ray florets. The species grows in marshes and on the borders of estuaries.

References

External links
Atlas of Florida Vascular Plants
University of Floriday Center for Aquatic and Invasive Plants 
Native Florida Wildflowers
Southeastern Flora

mitis
Flora of the United States
Plants described in 1803